Mururata is a village in the tropical valleys of the Bolivian Yungas. It is a centre of Afro-Bolivian culture, and of the ceremonial Afro-Bolivian monarchy.

The area was originally populated during the 16th century. Under Spanish colonialism, African slave labour was used in the silver mines from the 17th century onwards. In the 19th century, after the abolition of slavery, freed slaves established the village of Mururata.

References

Populated places in La Paz Department (Bolivia)